The Next Step is Kurt Rosenwinkel's fourth album as a band leader. It is his second release on Verve, and regarded as a major step in his creative evolution. Rosenwinkel says of the album: "It represents the culmination of many life phases for me. Some of these phases started ten years ago and have finally found resolution in this record. It represents the next step in my music and in my life". The album debuts a number of compositions which would become staples of his live performances, and would also be rerecorded on his albums Deep Song and Star of Jupiter. The material was developed by the band during their frequent gigs at Smalls Jazz Club in New York City. Mitch Borden, the club's owner recalled that, "Kurt Rosenwinkel's band played with such dramatic fire, that it would consume everyone present". The album features several songs with alternate guitar tunings, and also showcases Kurt Rosenwinkel's piano playing on the title track.

Track listing
All compositions by Kurt Rosenwinkel
 "Zhivago" – 9:04
 "Minor Blues" – 5:54
 "A Shifting Design" – 7:11
 "Path of the Heart" – 6:15
 "Filters" – 7:43
 "Use of Light" – 9:17
 "The Next Step" – 10:01
 "A Life Unfolds" – 6:31

Personnel
 Kurt Rosenwinkel – guitar, piano (track 7)
 Mark Turner – tenor saxophone
 Ben Street – bass
 Jeff Ballard – drums

References

External links
 The Next Step at Verve Records
 A Japanese bonus track from The Next Step album on YouTube

2001 albums
Kurt Rosenwinkel albums